The Diocese of Kuching is a diocese of the Anglican Church of the Province of South East Asia that covers Sarawak (in Malaysia) and Brunei. Founded in 1962, the see was originally established as the Bishopric of Sarawak linked to the Diocese of Labuan in 1855. The current bishop is the Most Rev'd Danald Jute, 14th Lord Bishop of the Diocese of Kuching and Brunei, who was consecrated on 13 August 2017. His seat is at St. Thomas' Cathedral, Kuching.

History

The first sixty years 
An Anglican mission, called the Borneo Church Mission, was established in 1846 and the Anglican Church began in Sarawak on 29 June 1848, when a party of missionaries arrived at the invitation of James Brooke, Rajah of Sarawak. Francis Thomas McDougall who led the group was deemed suitable for the job because he was a doctor as well as a priest.

The Rajah gave the missionaries a piece of land on which to build their base. The land was used to build a church, which was to serve as pro-cathedral for many years, as well as a school which later grew into St. Thomas' and St. Mary's, and also a dispensary.

It was soon realised that the Church in the Rajah's territory would be better administered as a bishopric. The Society for the Propagation of the Gospel supported the proposal and contributed a sum of £5,000 towards the endowment. However, the political conventions of the day ruled that no Anglican diocese could be created outside the limits of the British Empire, and Sarawak was technically an independent principality of the Rajah. The difficulty was sidestepped by founding the diocese upon the island of Labuan, a Crown Colony since 1846. The bishop of Labuan could then be appointed bishop of Sarawak by the Rajah. This practice prevailed until Sarawak became a Crown Colony in 1946.

Letters Patent were issued on 6 August 1855, erecting the "Island of Labuan and its Dependencies into a Bishop's See or Diocese to be styled the Bishopric of Labuan." McDougall was nominated by the Crown as the first bishop, and was consecrated on 18 October 1855 in Calcutta. On 1 January 1856 he was appointed bishop of Sarawak.

The linked diocese of Labuan and bishopric of Sarawak increased in size as the principality grew and Anglican work in North Borneo and Brunei developed. It extended further when, by an Act of Parliament in 1869, the Church in the Straits Settlements (Singapore, Penang and Malacca) was separated from the see of Calcutta and placed under the episcopal care of the bishop of Labuan. This arrangement lasted until 1909, when the diocese of Singapore was founded.

The first sixty years of the Church in Borneo were a chronicle of effort, disappointment and service by priests and lay missionaries. Asian workers played an increasingly larger part as time passed because the formation of a truly indigenous church had been intended from the beginning.

20th century and today 
After 1909, when the bishop could concentrate on Borneo alone, a new era in the Church began. Three decades of growth and development followed, with the longed-for ordination of Dayak and Chinese clergy in increasing numbers.

After the devastation of World War II the diocese of Labuan and the bishopric of Sarawak were joined into the diocese of Borneo and in 1949 Nigel Cornwall was consecrated bishop. His immediate task was to restore the ruins of the churches, schools and other mission property destroyed during the years of the Japanese occupation. 1953 saw the construction of the new St. Thomas' Cathedral to replace the leaky wooden edifice built by McDougall. Men prepared for ordination at the House of the Epiphany (established in 1952) provided nine new priests for the area in 1956.

By 1962 plans were completed for the division of the diocese of Borneo. The new diocese of Jesselton (Sabah) including Labuan came into being on 24 July 1962. The remainder of the diocese, including Brunei, was reconstituted as the Diocese of Kuching on 13 August 1962. Nigel Cornwall continued as Bishop.

The limits of the Diocese are those of the present administrative divisions of the State of Sarawak and Brunei Darussalam together with that part of Indonesian Borneo lying North of the equator, and West of longitude 115 º42’.

On 7 April 1970 the diocese of West Malaysia was formed to separate that region from Singapore.

The present Bishop is the Right Reverend Danald Jute, who is the 14th Lord Bishop of Kuching since 1855, when the diocese was first created.

Archdeaconries 
The diocese is divided into five distinct archdeaconries.
 Archdeaconry of Northern Sarawak
 Archdeaconry of Central Sarawak
 Archdeaconry of Upper South Sarawak
 Archdeaconry of Lower North Sarawak
 Archdeaconry of Lower South Sarawak

Parishes

Parishes in Sarawak, Malaysia 
 St. Thomas' Cathedral, Kuching, McDougall Road, P.O. Box 347, 93704 Kuching, Sarawak, Malaysia.
 St. Mathew's Church, Mundai, 24th. Mile Kuching/Serian Road, 94200 Kuching, Sarawak, Malaysia.
 St. Faith's Church, Kuching, Chawan Road, Kenyalang Park, P.O. Box 976, 93720 Kuching, Sarawak, Malaysia.
 St. Paul’s Church, Siol Kandis, Petra Jaya, P.O. Box 347, 93704 Kuching, Sarawak, Malaysia.
 St. James's Church, Kuap, P.O. Box 347, 93704 Kuching, Sarawak, Malaysia.
 St. Francis's Church, Samarahan, P.O. Box 347, 93704 Kuching, Sarawak, Malaysia.
 St. Philip's Church, Padawan, P.O. Box 347, 93704 Kuching, Sarawak, Malaysia.
 St. Paul's Church, Bunuk, P.O. Box 347, 93704 Kuching, Sarawak, Malaysia.
 St. John's Church, Taee, P.O. Box 347, 93704 Kuching, Sarawak, Malaysia.
 St. Maria's Church, Abok, P.O. Box 347, 93704 Kuching, Sarawak, Malaysia.
 St. Luke's Church, Sri Aman, Sabu Road, P.O. Box 220, 95008 Sri Aman, Sarawak, Malaysia.
 St. Francis's Church, Lundu, Jalan Sekambal, 94500 Lundu, Sarawak, Malaysia.
 St. Stephen’s Church, Simunjan, Jalan Sabun, Peti Surat 3, 94800 Simunjan, Sarawak, Malaysia.
 St. Michael's Church, Engkilili, Jalan Belon ak. Upak, 95800 Engkilili, Sarawak, Malaysia.
 St. Philip's Church, Lubok Antu, 95900 Sri Aman, Sarawak, Malaysia
 St. Augustine's Church, Betong, Jalan Datuk Basil Temenggong, 95700 Betong, Sarawak, Malaysia.
 St. Helen's Church, Serian, P.O. Box 81, 94700, Serian, Sarawak, Malaysia.
 St. Christopher's Church, Debak, 95500 Debak, Sarawak, Malaysia.
 St. Peter's Church, Saratok, P.O. Box 24, 95400 Saratok, Sarawak, Malaysia.
 St. John's Church, Sibu, Jalan Tun Abg. Hj. Openg, P.O. Box 1315, 96008 Sibu, Sarawak, Malaysia.
 St. Thomas' Church, Bintulu, P.O. Box 120, 97007 Bintulu, Sarawak, Malaysia.
 St. Boniface's Church, Mamut, c/o St. Giles' Chapel, P.O. Box 57, 98200 Batu Niah, Miri, Sarawak, Malaysia.
 St. Columba's Church, Miri, P.O. Box 233, 98007 Miri, Sarawak, Malaysia.
 The Church of Good Shepherd, Lutong, P.O. Box 423, 98107 Lutong, Miri, Sarawak, Malaysia.
 St. Mark's Church, Limbang, P.O. Box 107, 98707 Limbang, Sarawak, Malaysia.
 Tabuan Jaya Anglican Church, No.262, Lorong Song 1, Tabuan Heights, 93350 Kuching, Sarawak, Malaysia.
 All Saints' Church, Tabuan, P.O.Box 347,93704 Kuching, Sarawak, Malaysia
 St.Basil's Church, Siol Kandis, P.O.Box 347, 93704 Kuching, Sarawak, Malaysia
 St.Matthew's Church, Batu Kawa, Sungai Maong, Survey Lot 3573, Lot 2520, Fl.1, SL 5, Jalan Sungai Maong Utama, 93200 Kuching, Sarawak.
 St.Simon's Church, Malihah, Synergy Square, Matang Jaya, Jln.Matang, 93050 Kuching, Sarawak.
 St.Margaret's Church, Stampin, Kampung Stampin, Off Taman BDC, Jalan Stutong, 93350, Kuching, Sarawak, Malaysia.
 Christ Church, Stunggang, Kampung Stunggang Dayak 94500 Lundu, Sarawak, Malaysia.
 All Saints' Anglican Church, Bengoh Resettlement Scheme (BRS)
 St.Mary's Church, Kandis Lama, Bau, c/o P.O.Box 347, 93704, Kuching, Sarawak, Malaysia.
 St. Lawrence's Church, Sabu, Sri Aman, Sarawak, Malaysia.
 St.Stephen's Church, Pantu, P.O.Box 347, 93704 Kuching, Sarawak, Malaysia.
 St.Benedict's Church, Skrang, 95800, Engkilili, Skrang, Betong Division, Sarawak, Malaysia.
 St.Paul's Church, Roban, 95300, Bahagian Betong, Sarawak, Malaysia.
 St.Alban's Church, Sarikei, C/O P.O.Box 424, 965507 Bintangor, Sibu, Sarawak, Malaysia.
 St.Giles's Church, Batu Niah, P.O.Box 57, 98200 Batu Niah, Miri, Sarawak.
 St.Barnabas's Church, Miri, Lot 4885, Jalan Rejang 4, Jalan Sibu, 98000, Taman Tunku, Miri, Sarawak, Malaysia.
 Holy Trinity Church, Lambir, Lot 94, Jalan Meranti, Kpg Tunku Abdul Rahman Lambir P.O.Box 617, 98000, Miri, Sarawak.
 St.Matthias's Church, Tudan, Lot 1455, Lorong Perdana 5C, Desaras, Tudan Phase 6, P.O.Box 47, 98107 Lutong, Miri, Sarawak

Parishes in Brunei Darussalam 
 St. James's Church, Kuala Belait, P.O. Box 79, Kuala Belait KA1131, Negara Brunei Darussalam
 St. Margaret's Church, Seria, P.O. Box 788, Seria KB1133, Negara Brunei Darussalam
 St. Andrew's Church, BSB, P.O. Box 126, Bandar Seri Begawan BS8670, Negara Brunei Darussalam

Mission districts 
 St. Mary's Church, Matang c/o P.O.Box 347, 93704 Kuching
 St. Paul's Church, Banting c/o P.O.Box 347, 93704 Kuching
 St. Simon's Chapel, Sebuyau c/o P.O.Box 347, 93704, Kuching

THE HOUSE OF THE EPIPHANY

THE KIDURONG ANGLICAN CENTRE 
 Lot 3028, Jalan Abang Matassan, Tg,Kidurong, 97000 Bintulu, Sarawak

See also 
Anglicanism
Borneo Mission Association
Province of the Anglican Church in South East Asia
Council of Churches Malaysia
Persatuan Gereja-gereja Sarawak

External links

References 

Church of the Province of South East Asia
Christian organizations established in 1962
Anglican dioceses established in the 20th century
Anglican dioceses in Asia